Six Feet Under may refer to:
 A euphemistic phrase for burial in a grave, or more generally for death

Music

Groups
 Six Feet Under (band), an American death metal band

Albums and soundtracks
 6 Feet Under (album), a 2004 album by Gravediggaz
 Six Feet Under (soundtrack), a 2002 soundtrack album with music from the TV series
 Six Feet Under, Vol. 2: Everything Ends a 2005 soundtrack album from the TV series

Songs
 "Six Feet Under", a song by Franco-British singer MeeK from his 2007 album "Sortie de Secours"
 "Six Feet Under" (The Weeknd song), a song by The Weeknd on the 2016 album Starboy
 "Six Feet Under", a song by South Korean boy group VIXX from the 2016 album Zelos
 "Six Feet Under", a song by No Doubt from Return of Saturn
 "Six Feet Under", a song by King Diamond from The Spider's Lullabye
 "Six Feet Under (Billie Eilish song)", a 2016 song by Billie Eilish

Television and film
 Six Feet Under (TV series), an American drama television series
 Manorama Six Feet Under, a 2007 Indian film